Portglenone Football Club is an intermediate-level football club that formerly played in the Premier division of the Ballymena & Provincial League in Northern Ireland.

External links
 nifootball.co.uk - (For fixtures, results and tables of all Northern Ireland amateur football leagues)

Association football clubs in Northern Ireland
Association football clubs in County Antrim